Rugby in Bosnia and Herzegovina may refer to:

Rugby union in Bosnia and Herzegovina
Rugby league in Bosnia and Herzegovina